Robert Tyng Bushnell  (born January 9, 1896, in New York City, died October 23, 1949, in Manhattan) was an American politician who served as Massachusetts Attorney General from 1941 to 1945.

Early career
A Boston lawyer, Bushnell served as District Attorney of Middlesex County, President of the Republican Club of Massachusetts, and chairman of the Boston chapter of the Motion Picture Research Council before being elected Attorney General.

Attorney General
As Attorney General, Bushnell lead the investigation into the Cocoanut Grove fire. Bushnell's investigation resulted a reform of fire codes and club owner Barney Welansky being convicted of involuntary manslaughter.

In 1941, Bushnell and state representative Benjamin Priest conducted the prosecution during the impeachment trial of Massachusetts Governor's Councilor Daniel H. Coakley. On October 2, 1941, the Massachusetts Senate found Coakley guilty on 10 of the 14 articles on impeachment. The Senate voted 28 to 10 to remove Coakley from office and 23 to 15 to bar him for life from holding a place of "profit or honor or trust" in the Commonwealth.

In 1942, Bushnell tried to have fascist leader Edward Holton James committed to a psychiatric state hospital after he was indicted on charges of criminal libel.

In 1943, he indicted Boston Police Commissioner Joseph F. Timilty and six of his subordinates on charges of conspiracy to permit the operation of gambling houses and the registration of bets.

Death
Bushnell died on October 23, 1949, in his suite at the Royalton Hotel from a heart attack.

References

1896 births
1949 deaths
District attorneys in Middlesex County, Massachusetts
Harvard Law School alumni
Massachusetts Attorneys General
Politicians from Newton, Massachusetts
Politicians from New York City
Massachusetts Republicans
20th-century American politicians
Lawyers from New York City
20th-century American lawyers